Sin Daños a Terceros is the seventh studio album released on June 2, 1998 by Guatemalan singer-songwriter Ricardo Arjona.

Reception
The AllMusic review by Terry Jenkins awarded the album 4 stars stating "Sin Daños a Terceros continues Ricardo Arjona's streak of accomplished, affecting albums that spotlights both his melodic skills and his sharp social consciousness.".

Track listing
All tracks by Ricardo Arjona except where noted.

 "Te Guste o No" (Like it or not) – 3:36
 "Mentiroso" (Liar) – 3:59
 "Olvidarte" (Forget You) – 5:31
 "Desnuda" (Naked) – 4:15
 "Loco" (Crazy) – 4:11
 "Dime Que No" (Tell Me No) – 4:25
 "Buenas Noches Don David" (Good Evening Mr. David) – 4:58
 "No Estoy Solo" (I'm Not Alone) – 3:55
 "Vientre de Cuna" (Womb’s a Cradle) – 3:29
 "Hoy Es Un Buen Día Para Empezar" (Today Is A Good Day To Start) – 5:18
 "Millonario de Luz" (Millionaire of Light) – 5:04
 "Con Una Estrella" (With A Star) – 4:15
 "A Siete Metros" (Seven Meters Away) – 5:04
 "Tarde (Sin Daños a Terceros)" (Late (No Harm To Third Parties)) – 4:17

Personnel

Musicians

 Ricardo Arjona – vocals, producer
 Fernando Acosta – soprano sax
 Patricia Aiken, Armen Anassian, Brian Benning, Rebecca Bunnell, Andrea Byers, Assa Drori, Tiffany Hu, Igor Kiskatchi, Dennis Molchan, Robert Sanov, Elizabeth Wilson, Shari Zippert – violin
 Vage Ayrikyan, Larry Corbett, Maurice Grants, Cecilia Tsan – cello
 Charles Bolto – clarinet
 Rodrigo Cárdenas – bass, acoustic guitar
 Jon Clarke – English horn, Oboe
 Lynn Grants, Andrew Picken, Kazi Pitelka, Karie Prescott – viola
 Larry Hall – trumpet
 Dan Higgins – alto sax
 Patricia Hodges, Leyla Hoyle, Kurt Lykes, Carlos Murguía, Stephanie Spruill, Tony Wilkins – backing vocals
 Michael Landau – acoustic guitar, electric guitar
 Frances Liu Wu – double bass
 Waldo Madera – arranger, drums
 Joseph Mayer – French horn
 Elizabeth Meza – vocals
 Armando Montiel – percussion
 Fernando Otero – arranger, keyboards, piano
 Bruce Otto – trombone
 Heitor Teixeira Pereira – acoustic guitar
 David Riddles – bassoon
 Felipe Souza – electric guitar
 Sheridon Stokes – flute
 David R. Stone – double bass
 Jerry Williams – timbales

Technical

 Christina Abaroa – production coordination
 Ricardo Arjona – arranger, producer
 Chris Bellman, Benny Faccone – mastering
 Alberto Carballo Cabiedes – graphic design
 Sergio Casillas – photo assistance
 Mauricio Garcia – assistant producer
 Alejandra Gutierrez – production coordination
 Don Hahn – orchestra contractor
 Edward M. Karen – general director
 John Karpowich – engineer
 Benny Faccone – engineer, mixing
 Luis Pinzón  – assistant engineer
 Alan Sanderson – assistant engineer
 Joanna Schatz – make-up
 Alicia Vivanco Sodi – art direction
 Ricardo Trabulsi – photography
 José Antonio Valencia – production coordination

Sales and certifications

References

1998 albums
Ricardo Arjona albums
Sony Discos albums